Bondamunda railway station (station code:- BNDM), located in the Indian state of Odisha, serves Bondamunda and Rourkela in Sundergarh district.

History
The Nagpur–Asansol main line of Bengal Nagpur Railway came up in 1891 and the cross-country Howrah–Nagpur–Mumbai line started functioning in 1900.

After independence of India, this area saw a lot of activity. In the 1950s when Rourkela Steel Plant was being constructed, a marshalling yard was set up at Bondamunda to cater to the requirements of bulk transportation. New lines were added. A  line was constructed to establish a direct link with Ranchi. Bondamunda  was connected to Barsuan iron ore mines in 1960 and the line was extended to Kiriburu in 1964. The marshalling yard is the second largest in India.

Bondamunda was electrified in the year between 1961–62.

Bondamunda - Rourkela (Diesel & Electric) Locomotive Shed 
Two locomotive sheds, one for steam locomotives and the other for diesel locomotives, was set up at Bondamunda in the 1950s.  The steam locomotive shed was closed in the late 1980s. An electric locomotive shed was started in 1983 for accommodating six WAM-4 locomotives. It increased to 50 within a short period. As of 2019, it accommodates 242 electric locomotives and is being expanded. A new electric locomotive shed is under construction having capacity of 200 WAG-9 locomotives.

Bimlagarh–Talcher Project
This line when complete would reduce the distance between Rourkela and Bhubaneswar, the state capital, from 460 km (via Sambalpur) to 300 km.

References

Railway stations in Sundergarh district
Chakradharpur railway division
Transport in Rourkela